Gegeneophis ramaswamii, common names Tenmalai caecilian, Tenmalai blind caecilian, Ramaswami's caecilian, and forest caecilian is a species of caecilian. It is endemic to the southern portion of the Western Ghats, India, and is recorded from Kerala and Tamil Nadu. The specific name ramaswamii honours L. S. Ramaswami, an Indian herpetologist.

Description
The colouration is greyish dorsally and light grey ventrally. The eyes are not visible. Its tentacles are placed just behind and below the level of the nostrils. The terminus of the body is wider than rest of the body.

Habitat and conservation
Gegeneophis ramaswamii occurs in wet evergreen forests, plantations, low-intensity agricultural land, at forest fringes, and along streams and rivers at elevations below . It is largely subterranean and lives in soil. The eggs are laid terrestrially. The development is direct, without a free-living larval stage.

This species can be very abundant locally, and is considered the most abundant species of caecilian within its range. It adapts to agricultural areas is not believed to be facing any significant threats. It is known to occur in some protected areas.

References

ramaswamii
Amphibians of India
Endemic fauna of the Western Ghats
Amphibians described in 1964
Taxa named by Edward Harrison Taylor